Pirates of the Mississippi is the debut studio album by the American country music band of the same name. It was released in 1990 on Capitol Records Nashville and contains four singles: "Honky Tonk Blues" (a cover of the Hank Williams song), "Rollin' Home", "Feed Jake", and "Speak of the Devil". "Feed Jake" was the highest charting of these singles, reaching #15 on the Billboard country charts. All of the other singles except "Rollin' Home" reached Top 40 on the same chart.

Track listing

Personnel
As listed in liner notes.

Musicians
Rich Alves – guitar, Hammond organ, background vocals
John Kelton - strings on "Feed Jake"
Jimmy Lowe – drums, percussion
Bill McCorvey – guitar, lead vocals
Pat Severs – steel guitar, Dobro
Dean Townson – bass guitar, background vocals

Technical
Chuck Ainlay - mixing
Rich Alves - producer
John Kelton - recording
Glenn Meadows - mastering
Tom Perry - overdubs
James Stroud - producer

Charts

Weekly charts

Year-end charts

References

1990 debut albums
Capitol Records albums
Pirates of the Mississippi albums
Albums produced by James Stroud